Richard Salisbury Ellis  (born 25 May 1950, Colwyn Bay, Wales) is Professor of Astrophysics at the University College London. He previously served as the Steele Professor of Astronomy at the California Institute of Technology (Caltech). 
He was awarded the 2011 Gold Medal of the Royal Astronomical Society. and the 2022 Royal Medal of the Royal Society.

Education
Ellis read astronomy at University College London and obtained a DPhil at Wolfson College at the University of Oxford in 1974.

Career and research

In 1985 he was appointed professor at the University of Durham (with two years at the Royal Greenwich Observatory) for his research contributions. In 1993 he moved to the University of Cambridge as the Plumian Professor and became a professorial fellow at Magdalene College. He served as director of the Institute of Astronomy from 1994 to 1999, at which point he moved to Caltech. Shortly after his arrival at Caltech, he was appointed as director of the Palomar Observatory which he later reorganized as the Caltech Optical Observatories taking into account the growing importance of Caltech's role in the Thirty Meter Telescope. After 16 years at Caltech, in September 2015 he returned to Europe via the award of a European Research Council Advanced Research Grant held at University College London (UCL).

Ellis works primarily in observational cosmology, considering the origin and evolution of galaxies, the evolution of large scale structure in the universe, and the nature and distribution of dark matter.  He worked on the Morphs collaboration studying the formation and morphologies of distant galaxies. Particular interests include applications using gravitational lensing and high-redshift supernovae. He was a member of the Supernova Cosmology Project whose leader, Saul Perlmutter, shared the 2011 Nobel Prize for Physics for the team's surprising discovery of the accelerating expansion of the Universe. His most recent discoveries relate to searches for the earliest known galaxies, seen when the Universe was only a few percent of its present age.

At Caltech, Ellis was director of the Palomar Observatory from 2000 to 2005 and played a key role in developing the scientific and technical case, as well as building the partnership, for the Thirty Meter Telescope - a collaborative effort involving Caltech, the University of California, Canada, Japan, China and India destined for Mauna Kea, Hawaii. When constructed this will be the largest ground-based optical and near-infrared telescope in the northern hemisphere.

Awards and honours
He was elected a Fellow of the Royal Society in 1995, appointed a Commander of the Order of the British Empire (CBE) in the 2008 New Year Honours and a Fellow and Corresponding Member of the Australian Academy of Science in 2018.

Publications
Ellis wrote When Galaxies Were Born: The Quest for Cosmic Dawn (Princeton University Press 2022) in which he describes the observational progress made by astronomers over his career of five decades in probing galaxies to ever greater distances, and hence to earlier periods of cosmic history. The story culminates with the prospects for witnessing cosmic dawn - the emergence of the first generation of galaxies from darkness -  with NASA's James Webb Space Telescope.

Ellis also contributed the text to a collection of striking photographs by Julian Abrams of the many large telescopes he has used in Modern Observatories of the World.

References

External links
Homepage at UCL
Homepage at Caltech	
Caltech Oral History Interview with Richard Ellis by Heidi Aspaturian Jan-Feb 2014
Oral History interview transcript with Richard Ellis 27 July 2007, American Institute of Physics, Niels Bohr Library and Archives

1950 births
Living people
Alumni of University College London
Alumni of Wolfson College, Oxford
21st-century British astronomers
British cosmologists
Fellows of Magdalene College, Cambridge
Fellows of the Royal Society
Academics of Durham University
Commanders of the Order of the British Empire
People from Colwyn Bay
Recipients of the Gold Medal of the Royal Astronomical Society
California Institute of Technology faculty
Academics of University College London
European Research Council grantees
Plumian Professors of Astronomy and Experimental Philosophy